Borgoforte is a frazione of the  comune (municipality) of Borgo Virgilio in the Province of Mantua in the Italian region Lombardy, located about  southeast of Milan and about  southwest of Mantua. 
In 2014 it merged with  Virgilio to form the municipality of Borgo Virgilio.

It is home to a Rocca (castle or fortress), founded by the House of Gonzaga in the 13th century. After various vicissitudes, it was an important stronghold of the Austrian Empire in the Kingdom of Lombardy–Venetia, being captured by Italian troops during the Third Italian Independence War in 1866.

References

Cities and towns in Lombardy